The 1991–92 Colonial Hockey League season was the first season of the Colonial Hockey League, a North American minor professional league. Five teams participated in the regular season, and the Thunder Bay Thunder Hawks won the league title.

Regular season

Colonial Cup-Playoffs

External links
 Season 1991/92 on hockeydb.com 

United Hockey League seasons
CHL
CHL